Hypselodoris rudmani is a species of sea slug or dorid nudibranch, a marine gastropod mollusk in the family Chromodorididae. This species is named after the well known malacologist William B. Rudman.

Distribution
The holotype of this nudibranch was collected at  depth from Philip’s Reef, Port Elizabeth, Algoa Bay, Cape Province, South Africa. Two additional specimens in the original description were from warmer water sites further north at Park Rynie, Natal and Umgazana, Eastern Cape, South Africa. A specimen from Pointe Evatra, South Madagascar was sequenced for three genes in a landmark study which resulted in the description of 17 new species of Hypselodoris.

Description
Hypselodoris rudmani has a translucent body dotted with white patches, and covered in small blue spots. The gills and rhinophores are white, tipped with orange. Hypselodoris rudmani is a member of a large clade that includes Hypselodoris katherinae, Hypselodoris paradisa, Hypselodoris maritima, Hypselodoris skyleri and Hypselodoris bertschi.

This species can reach a total length of at least 25 mm.

References

Chromodorididae
Gastropods described in 1999